The Charles Allis House (also known as the Charles Allis Art Library) is a historic house located at 1630 East Royall Place in Milwaukee, Wisconsin. It is locally significant due to its association with Charles Allis, who took a deep interest in art and was the first president of the Milwaukee Art Society and a trustee of the Layton Art Gallery, among other things.

Description and history 
Constructed in 1909, the -story house was designed by the distinguished local architect Alexander C. Eschweiler. It has exterior walls of mauve-brown Ohio brick trimmed with Lake Superior sandstone of a similar but lighter hue. Steeply pitched intersecting gabled roofs top the house.

It was listed on the National Register of Historic Places on January 17, 1975.

References

Houses in Milwaukee County, Wisconsin
Houses completed in 1909
Houses on the National Register of Historic Places in Wisconsin
Tudor Revival architecture in Wisconsin
National Register of Historic Places in Milwaukee County, Wisconsin